Tascia instructa is a moth of the family Zygaenidae. It is known from the Democratic Republic of the Congo, Liberia and Sierra Leone.

References

Procridinae
Moths of Africa
Moths described in 1854